Dave Thomas (born 1956) is a computer programmer, author and editor.  He has written about Ruby and together with Andy Hunt, he co-authored The Pragmatic Programmer and runs The Pragmatic Bookshelf publishing company. Thomas moved to the United States from England in 1994 and lives north of Dallas, Texas.

Thomas coined the phrases 'Code Kata' and 'DRY' (Don't Repeat Yourself), and was an original signatory and author of The Manifesto for Agile Software Development. He studied computer science at Imperial College London.

Works

 The Pragmatic Programmer, Andrew Hunt and David Thomas, 1999, Addison Wesley, .
 Programming Ruby: A Pragmatic Programmer's Guide, David Thomas and Andrew Hunt, 2000, Addison Wesley, 
 Pragmatic Version Control Using CVS, David Thomas and Andrew Hunt, 2003, The Pragmatic Bookshelf, 
 Pragmatic Unit Testing in Java with JUnit, Andrew Hunt and David Thomas, 2003, The Pragmatic Bookshelf, 
 Pragmatic Unit Testing in C# with Nunit, Andrew Hunt and David Thomas, 2004, The Pragmatic Bookshelf, 
 Programming Ruby (2nd Edition), Dave Thomas, Chad Fowler, and Andrew Hunt, 2004, The Pragmatic Bookshelf, 
 Pragmatic Unit Testing in C# with Nunit, 2nd Edition, Andy Hunt and David Thomas with Matt Hargett, 2007, The Pragmatic Bookshelf, 
 Agile Web Development with Rails, Dave Thomas, David Heinemeier Hansson, Andreas Schwarz, Thomas Fuchs, Leon Breedt, and Mike Clark, 2005, Pragmatic Bookshelf, 
 Agile Web Development with Rails (2nd edition), Dave Thomas, with David Heinemener Hansson, Mike Clark, Justin Gehtland, James Duncan Davidson, 2006, Pragmatic Bookshelf, 
 Programming Elixir: Functional |> Concurrent |> Pragmatic |> Fun, Dave Thomas, foreword by José Valim the creator of Elixir, and edited by Lynn Beighley, 2014, Pragmatic Bookshelf,

References

External links
 pragprog.com, website for the Pragmatic Programmers
 Dave Thomas's Blog
 CodeKata
 Dave Thomas Interview: The Corruption of Agile; Ruby and Elixir; Katas and More, Dr.Dobb's, March 18, 2014.

Computer programmers
American technology writers
British emigrants to the United States
1956 births
Living people